This article lists events that occurred during 1920 in Estonia.

Incumbents

Events
 2 February – Treaty of Tartu which gave Estonia recognition by Soviet Russia. 
 15 June – adoption of Constitution.

Births
21 March – Georg Ots, singer

Deaths

References

 
1920s in Estonia
Estonia
Estonia
Years of the 20th century in Estonia